The Full City Oil Spill was a major fuel oil spill incident that occurred on July 31, 2009 when the bulk carrier Full City ran aground on the island of Såstein / Sastein south of Langesund, Telemark, Norway. The ship, said to be operated by a HK subsidiary of COSCO with 23 crew members on board, spilled around 200 tons,  of IFO-380 heavy fuel oil. With also 120 tons of diesel. The oil contaminated 75 km of Norwegian coastline, including Langesund, Vestfold, and the Lille Såstein Bird Sanctuary.  There was oil slicks in approximately 200 locations along the shoreline between Larvik Municipality and
Lilles.

The oil spill was reported at night and the oil spill response actions started working the next day. They realized quickly that there was a large amount of oil spill in the ecological sensitive areas. Thousands of sea birds were covered in oil, and although volunteers made efforts to save them, many of the birds had to be shot due to the irreversible damage to their health. In total there was about 1500-2000 eider and 500 other sea birds that were killed during the accident. A couple of other affects were fjord, they are considered to be in a protected areas and sanctuaries. On Sunday August 2, 2009 a group of specialist were working at a rapid rate to clean up the disaster that was left behind from the oil. There was an extensive mentation of the environment and the consequences that were caused. It took around 15000-18000 weekdays to clean everything. The total estimated cost for all the fixing and remodeling action was about 25m euros. There was also 2 m euros that was used for environmental monitoring till 2014.

The Institute of Marine Research ran tests on the affected areas to track any significant ecological impacts but noted that the marine and fish life suffered no significant changes. The research was included in a study of four oil spills that occurred in the Norwegian coastal area, including the Rocknes Oil Spill, the Server Oil Spill, and the Godafoss Oil Spill.

On 2009 a powerful wind was steering the toxic oil towards the coastline which lead the diesel fuel oil threatening coastal areas of southern Norway after a Panamanian freighter. A couple day before ships were alerted about a gale in Skagerrak. The following day there was an increase of warning alerts of wind towards the southeast at a level of 7, going up to a level 10.The ship suffered with an engine failure and aground in stormy conditions over night. The heavy wind became constant for five hours before the accident occurred, but then started to decrease and stop a couple hours after the oil spill. It was told that the wind was decreasing at a fast rate. The Accident Investigation Board Norway informed  that the Full City drifted to-ward Sastein Island approximately at 9:50 pm; due to strong winds and waves from southwest  Conservationist critiqued how authorities prioritized the 23 crew members instead of acting rapidly to set up barriers.

After the accident the wind speed suddenly decreased, extending calm conditions the first of August. It was foreseen that the results of wind-driven would weaken. Significant beaching of oil was seen north-northeast of the accident. Areas southeast of the accident contained a large amount of bleaching approximately two days after the oil spill. The bleaching that occurred remains unknown, however it appears to have correlation within the time span from August 1–2. Further observations of the southwest amount of oil remains undetermined. The amount of bleaching scatter was low in the southeast 50 km range from the oil spill.

The Master and Third Officer of the ship were both charged with violating the Pollution Act due to their failure to take adequate measures to prevent pollution. The master was also found guilty of violating provision of the ship safety Act. The Master was sentenced to 6 months with 120 days suspended, and the Third Officer was sentenced to 60 days with 39 days suspended. Both these individuals were detained in Norway for four-and-a-half months, officials feared they would evade punishment. However, they were released on bail; coming back to Norway from China, presenting themselves Infront of the supreme court. From this case officials hope law enforcement will follow this case, and use the same tactics. Norwegian court is one of the first to considered the application of the Ship Safety Act. As of April 2010 the ship was in Gothenburg for repairs in drydock.

See also 
 List of oil spills
 MARPOL 73/78 - Environmental agreement

References 

2009 in Norway
Oil spills in Norway
Maritime incidents in 2009
Environment of Norway
2009 in the environment
COSCO Shipping

sv:Full City